This is a list of Greek Orthodox churches in the United States that are notable, either as buildings or as church congregations.  Some are buildings that are listed on the National Register of Historic Places or state- or local historic register for their architecture or other reasons.  Some are former church buildings;  others are current churches within the Greek Orthodox Archdiocese of America.

These are Orthodox Christian cathedrals or churches in North America that are notable, whether for their architectural design and or historical characteristics or for other reasons.

These are:
(by state then city)

Also by state then city:
 Holy Trinity Greek Orthodox Church (San Francisco, California)
St. John's Greek Orthodox Church, Pueblo, CO, NRHP-listed
Saint Sophia Cathedral (Washington, D.C.)
St. Nicholas Greek Orthodox Cathedral (Tarpon Springs, Florida)
 Annunciation Greek Orthodox Cathedral (Atlanta), Georgia
Greek Orthodox Church of Saint George, Des Moines, IA, NRHP-listed
Greek Orthodox Cathedral of New England, Boston, MA, NRHP-listed
 Annunciation Greek Orthodox Cathedral of New England, Boston, Massachusetts
 Holy Trinity Greek Orthodox Church (Lowell, Massachusetts), NRHP-listed
Assumption Greek Orthodox Church, University City, MO, NRHP-listed
First Methodist Episcopal--Holy Trinity Greek Orthodox Church, Steubenville, OH, NRHP-listed
St. George's Greek Orthodox Church, Southbridge, MA, NRHP-listed
St. Euphrosynia Belarusian Orthodox Church, New Jersey
Archdiocesan Cathedral of the Holy Trinity, New York, New York
St. Spyridon Greek Orthodox Church (New York), New York
All Saints Antiochian Orthodox Church, Raleigh, North Carolina
Holy Trinity Greek Orthodox Cathedral (Charlotte, North Carolina)
Holy Trinity Ukrainian Greek Orthodox Church,	Wilton, ND, NRHP-listed
First Methodist Episcopal-Holy Trinity Greek Orthodox Church, Steubenville, Ohio, listed on the NRHP in Jefferson County, Ohio
 Holy Trinity Greek Orthodox Church (Tulsa, Oklahoma)
Greek Orthodox Church of the Holy Trinity, Charleston, SC, NRHP-listed
 Annunciation Greek Orthodox Cathedral (Houston), Texas
 Holy Trinity Greek Orthodox Cathedral (Phoenix), Arizona

References

 
United States
Greek Orthodox